Xinpu may refer to:

China 
 Xinpu District (新浦区), a former district in Lianyungang, Jiangsu, now part of Haizhou District
 Xinpu, Cixi (新浦镇), town in Cixi, Ningbo, Zhejiang
 Xinpu, Jiaoling (新铺镇), a town in Jiaoling County, Meizhou, Guangdong
 Xinpu, Shimen (新铺乡), a township in Shimen County, Changde, Hunan

Taiwan 
Xinpu, Hsinchu (新埔鎮), urban township in Hsinchu County
Xinpu Station (新埔站), station on the Banqiao Line of the Taipei Metro in Banqiao, New Taipei